Anna Kędzierska (1932 – 16 September 2020) was a Polish economist and politician who served as Minister of Internal Trade and Service in the government of Poland.

She was born in Ostrowiec Świętokrzyski, and was a graduate of the Higher School of Economics in Częstochowa.

References

1932 births
2020 deaths
Polish politicians